Sofiane Melliti (born 18 August 1978) is a Tunisian football midfielder who played for Gaziantepspor.

Melliti scored his first goal for the Tunisian national team in January 2006, and played one match at the upcoming 2006 African Cup of Nations. In May he was called up to the 2006 World Cup. In January 2009, Al Hilal of Libya, having made several negotiations to sign him previously, are still deliberating a deal for him

References

External links
 

1978 births
Living people
Tunisian footballers
Tunisian expatriate footballers
2006 FIFA World Cup players
Tunisia international footballers
Ukrainian Premier League players
Süper Lig players
Espérance Sportive de Tunis players
CA Bizertin players
Olympique Béja players
CS Hammam-Lif players
FC Vorskla Poltava players
Expatriate footballers in Ukraine
Gaziantepspor footballers
Expatriate footballers in Turkey
Association football midfielders